The Cheshire Farm Trail is a walking trail along the South Fork of Peachtree Creek in Atlanta. Ribbon cutting occurred in September 2014.

The trail, costing ca. 1 million US dollars, was funded by Georgia Department of Transportation to appease local residents who were not happy about construction of a flyover for the Georgia 400/I-85 interchange. The trail is named for the Cheshire family, Atlanta pioneers. Two brothers of the family had homesteads across the creek from each other. The bridge they built gives name to the local thoroughfare Cheshire Bridge Road

References

Hiking trails in Atlanta